Wyre Forest District Council elections are held every four years. Wyre Forest District Council is the local authority for the non-metropolitan district of Wyre Forest in Worcestershire, England. Prior to 2019 elections were held three years out of every four, with a third of the council elected each time. Since the last boundary changes in 2015, 33 councillors have been elected from 12 wards.

Political control
The first elections to the council were held in 1973, initially operating as a shadow authority before coming into its powers on 1 April 1974. Political control of the council since 1974 has been held by the following parties:

Leadership
The leaders of the council since 1974 have been:

Council elections
Summary of the council composition after recent council elections, click on the year for full details of each election. Boundary changes took place for the 2004 and 2015 elections, leading to the whole council bring elected in those years. The number of councillors was reduced from 42 to 33 for the 2015 election.

1973 Wyre Forest District Council election
1975 Wyre Forest District Council election
1976 Wyre Forest District Council election
1978 Wyre Forest District Council election
1979 Wyre Forest District Council election (New ward boundaries)
1980 Wyre Forest District Council election
1982 Wyre Forest District Council election
1983 Wyre Forest District Council election
1984 Wyre Forest District Council election
1986 Wyre Forest District Council election (District boundary changes took place but the number of seats remained the same)
1987 Wyre Forest District Council election
1988 Wyre Forest District Council election

District result maps

By-election results
By-elections occur when seats become vacant between council elections. Below is a summary of recent by-elections; full by-election results can be found by clicking on the by-election name.

References

External links
Wyre Forest District Council

 
Wyre Forest District
Council elections in Worcestershire
District council elections in England
Council elections in Hereford and Worcester